Trinchesia albocrusta, common name white-crusted aeolid, is a species of sea slug, an aeolid nudibranch, a marine gastropod mollusc in the family Trinchesiidae.

Distribution
This species was described from Pacific Grove, California, United States. It has been recorded along the Eastern Pacific coastline of North America from Prince William Sound, Alaska to La Paz, Baja California, Mexico.

References 

 Turgeon, D.; Quinn, J.F.; Bogan, A.E.; Coan, E.V.; Hochberg, F.G.; Lyons, W.G.; Mikkelsen, P.M.; Neves, R.J.; Roper, C.F.E.; Rosenberg, G.; Roth, B.; Scheltema, A.; Thompson, F.G.; Vecchione, M.; Williams, J.D. (1998). Common and scientific names of aquatic invertebrates from the United States and Canada: mollusks. 2nd ed. American Fisheries Society Special Publication, 26. American Fisheries Society: Bethesda, MD (USA). . IX, 526 + cd-rom pp.

External links
  Cella, K; Carmona Barnosi, L.; Ekimova, I; Chichvarkhin, A; Schepetov, D; Gosliner, T. M. (2016). A radical solution: The phylogeny of the nudibranch family Fionidae. PLoS ONE. 11(12): e0167800
 Korshunova, T.; Martynov, A.; Picton, B. (2017). Ontogeny as an important part of integrative taxonomy in tergipedid aeolidaceans (Gastropoda: Nudibranchia) with a description of a new genus and species from the Barents Sea. Zootaxa. 4324(1): 1

Trinchesiidae
Gastropods described in 1966